Lepidophyma dontomasi, MacDougall's tropical night lizard, is a species of lizard in the family Xantusiidae. It is a small lizard found in Mexico. It is known only from the type locality on Cerro Lachiguiri in  Oaxaca state, where it was collected at 2200 meters elevation. It may be more widespread.

References

Lepidophyma
Endemic reptiles of Mexico
Fauna of the Sierra Madre de Oaxaca
Reptiles described in 1942
Taxa named by Hobart Muir Smith